Netechma consimilis is a species of moth of the family Tortricidae. It is found in Ecuador (Loja Province).

The ground colour of the forewings is clear white with blackish dots in the terminal part of the wing and grey suffusions in the median cell and between three pairs of black marks at the costa. The hindwings are pale brownish creamy and spotted brownish except for the basal area which is whitish.

References

External links

Moths described in 2002
Endemic fauna of Ecuador
consimilis
Moths of South America
Taxa named by Józef Razowski